{{DISPLAYTITLE:C20H20}}
The molecular formula C20H20 (molar mass: 260.37 g/mol, exact mass: 260.1565 u) may refer to:

 Dodecahedrane
 Pagodane

Molecular formulas